Asanti Herring (born 9 December 1997) is a footballer who plays as a forward for the United States Virgin Islands national team.

Club career
Having left the Chicago Fire academy, Herring moved to England to continue his education. While in England, Herring turned out for semi-professional side Irlam.

For the 2017–18 season Herring joined FC Stein of the Bezirksliga Mittelfranken-Nord. During his season with the club he scored eleven goals in eleven matches for the reserve side but was unable to score in seven league appearances for the first team. The following year he joined TSV Sonnefeld of the Landesliga Bayern-Nordost. During his first season with the club he made 22 league appearances.

International career
Herring was named in the US Virgin Islands squad for 2017 Caribbean Cup qualification, and made his debut against Sint Maarten, scoring the first goal of a 2–1 win.

Career statistics

Club

International

Scores and results list US Virgin Islands' goal tally first, score column indicates score after each Herring goal.

References

External links
 Statistics at CaribbeanFootballDatabase

1997 births
Living people
United States Virgin Islands soccer players
Association football midfielders
United States Virgin Islands international soccer players
United States Virgin Islands expatriate soccer players
Expatriate footballers in Germany